This is a list of current and former Roman Catholic churches in the Roman Catholic Archdiocese of Newark. The archdiocese covers northeastern New Jersey, including the cities of Newark and Jersey City and the counties of Bergen, and Essex, Hudson, and Union. The cathedral church of the archdiocese is the Cathedral Basilica of the Sacred Heart in Newark.

Bergen County

Fort Lee

Garfield

Hackensack

Lyndhurst

Paramus

Other Bergen County

Essex County

Bloomfield

Irvington

Montclair

Newark

Nutley

Orange (East, South, West)

Other

Hudson County

Bayonne

Hoboken

Jersey City

Kearny

North Bergen

Union City

Other

Union County

Elizabeth

Linden

Plainfield

Westfield

Other

References

 
Newark